Razed (2008) is the second of three studio albums released by EOTO. Razed was recorded in Michael Travis's house in three days.

Track listing
"cacao" – 4:57
"ash" – 5:58
"warp" – 6:30
"camel bend" – 5:45
"tipped off" – 4:40
"taking the fife" – 5:11
"gloren" – 6:57
"health plant" – 4:41
"slank" – 4:48
"say it" – 4:28
"tar tar" – 7:02
"graved" – 11:08

References

External links
Last.fm
Discogs.com

2008 albums
EOTO albums